De Corazón is the eleventh studio album recorded by Puerto Rican salsa singer Gilberto Santa Rosa released on December 9, 1997. It was nominated for Tropical Salsa Album of the Year at the 10th Lo Nuestro AWards.

Track listing
This information adapted from Allmusic.

Chart performance

Certification

References

1997 albums
Gilberto Santa Rosa albums
Sony Discos albums